MHK Dolný Kubín is an ice hockey team in Dolný Kubín, Slovakia. They play in the Slovak 2. Liga, the third level of ice hockey in Slovakia. The club was founded in 1995.

Honours

Domestic

Slovak 2. Liga
  Winners (1): 2012–13

References

External links
 Official website

Dolný Kubín
Sport in Žilina Region
1995 establishments in Slovakia
Ice hockey clubs established in 1995